Masshysteri was a Swedish Post-Punk band, formed in Umeå in 2008. The group consisted of Robert Pettersson (rhythm guitar, vocals), Sara Almgren (bass guitar, vocals), Kajsa Bergsten (lead guitar) and Erik Viklund (drums)

History
Robert Pettersson, Erik Viklund and Sara Almgren previously played in the punk band The Vicious. The lyrics were English and they toured in the U.S. When The Vicious drummer André Sandström left the band, they had to find a stand-in. At the same point, they decided to write lyrics in Swedish. Erik took over the drums and Kajsa Bergsten joined the group on guitar. They released two 7"s and two full-length albums before they decided to disband. According to Dennis Lyxzén (their record company manager), internal problems between band members lead to the group breaking up.

Members
 Robert (Hurula) Pettersson - rhythm guitar, vocals
 Sara Almgren - bass guitar, vocals
 Kajsa Bergsten - lead guitar
 Erik Viklund - drums

Discography
 Vår del av stan (Ny Våg 2008)
 Masshysteri (Ny Våg 2010)

Singles
 Paranoid (2008)
 Monoton tid (2008)

References

External links 
 band's official MySpace

Swedish punk rock groups